Sandy James Beadle (July 12, 1960 — August 6, 1997) was a Canadian ice hockey left winger. During the 1980-81 season, he played in 6 games for the National Hockey League's Winnipeg Jets.

Beadle was born in Regina, Saskatchewan, Canada. Before joining the Jets, Beadle played junior with the Regina Pats, then played two seasons at Northeastern University in Boston, Massachusetts. Beadle scored 86 points in two seasons and was named All-American his sophomore season. Beadle played six games for Winnipeg in 1980–81, but played in the minor leagues until 1984. Beadle died at the early age of 37 on August 6, 1997 in Vinita, Oklahoma.

Career statistics

Regular season and playoffs

Awards and honors

References

External links
 

1960 births
1997 deaths
Canadian ice hockey left wingers
Estevan Bruins (SJHL) players
Fort Wayne Komets players
Ice hockey people from Saskatchewan
Northeastern Huskies men's ice hockey players
Regina Blues players
Regina Pats players
Sherbrooke Jets players
Sportspeople from Regina, Saskatchewan
Tulsa Oilers (1964–1984) players
Winnipeg Jets (1979–1996) draft picks
Winnipeg Jets (1979–1996) players
AHCA Division I men's ice hockey All-Americans